Italy has sent delegations to the Winter Paralympics since the secocon edition in Geilo 1980, the International Paralympic Committee (IPC).

Medal Tables

*Red border color indicates tournament was held on home soil.

Multiple medallists
These are official report of International Paralympic Committee.
 Athletes in bold are athletes who are still competing.
 Updated to Pyeongchang 2018.

See also 
 Italy at the Summer  Olympics

References

External links
Italian Paralympic Committee
International Paralympic Committee
Media Guide Tokyo 2020 
Gli Azzurri alle Paralimpiadi dal 1960 al 2018